Georgette is a feminine given name, the French form of  (Geōrgia), the feminine form of George.

Georgette may refer to:

People
 Georgette Barry (1919–2003), stage name Andrea King, American actress
 Georgette Bauerdorf (1924–1944), American socialite, heiress and murder victim
 Georgette Berube (1927–2005), American politician
 Georgette Chen (1906–1993), Singaporean painter
 Georgette Harvey (1882–1952), African-American singer and actress
 Georgette Heyer (1902–1974), English novelist
 Georgette Klinger (1915–2004), Czech-born American businesswoman and cosmetologist
 Georgette Leblanc (1869–1941, French operatic soprano, actress and author
 Georgette Meyer (1919–1965), also known as Dickey Chapelle, American photojournalist
 Georgette Mosbacher (born 1947), American business entrepreneur, executive, political activist and United States Ambassador to Poland
 Georgette Seabrooke (1916–2011), American muralist, illustrator, art therapist, non-profit chief executive and educator
 Georgette Sheridan (born 1952), Canadian lawyer and politician
 Georgette Tsinguirides (born 1928), German ballet dancer, ballet mistress and choreologist
 Georgette Valle (born 1924), American former politician
 Googie Withers (1917–2011), Anglo-Indian actress

Pseudonym
 Georgette Spelvin, variant on George Spelvin, a traditional American theatre pseudonym

Fictional characters
 Georgette Franklin (Baxter), recurring character on the American sitcom Mary Tyler Moore, played by Georgia Engel
 Georgette Lemare, in the anime/manga Strike Witches
 Georgettte, in the 1988 animated musical film Oliver & Company

Other uses
 Georgette (fabric), a lightweight fabric
 Battle of the Lys, also known as Operation Georgette

References

Feminine given names